Lake Karataş, also known as Lake Bahçeözü, is a fresh water lake in  Burdur Province, Turkey.

It is a shallow lake with a  surface area of. . It is a part of the closed basin known as Göller Yöresi ("Turkish Lakes Region") .
The main bird species of the lake are Eurasian wigeon, grey heron, white heron, pochard, teal, and black-tailed godwit.

References

Karatas
Landforms of Burdur Province
Important Bird Areas of Turkey
Mediterranean Region, Turkey